The Mary Pickford Theater, named in honor of silent film star Mary Pickford, is the "motion picture and television reading room" of the United States' Library of Congress in Washington, D.C.  It is on the third floor of the Library of Congress Madison building in downtown Washington.  The theater screens classic and contemporary movies and television shows, often organized by theme.  All screenings are free, though reservations must be made, as the theater accommodates only 64 people.

In 2020, showings were postponed due to the COVID-19 pandemic.

References

External links

Cinemas and movie theaters in Washington, D.C.
Library of Congress
Mary Pickford